André Onana Onana (born 2 April 1996) is a Cameroonian professional footballer who plays as a goalkeeper for  club Inter Milan.

Club career

Youth career
Born in Nkol Ngok, Onana joined Barcelona in 2010, after starting out at the Samuel Eto'o Foundation. Because he was a minor and extracommunitary, Onana had to go on loan in 2012 to the youth team of UE Cornellà for one season, being loaned again to the first team of UD Vista Alegre for another season.

Ajax

In early January 2015, it was announced that he would join Dutch club Ajax in July 2015. The transfer was brought forward later that month. He made his debut for Jong Ajax in the Eerste Divisie in February 2015. He signed a new contract with Ajax in May 2017, running until 2021. In March 2019 he signed a further new contract, until June 2022. In November 2019, he said he was interested in playing in the Premier League in England.

In February 2021, Onana was banned from playing for 12 months by UEFA after testing positive for Furosemide, a banned substance. Ajax said he took his wife's medicine by mistake and that they would appeal the decision. The ban was reduced to nine months by the Court of Arbitration for Sport in June.

In January 2022, he was linked with a transfer to Italian club Inter Milan. In May 2022, he announced that was leaving Ajax. Onana spent seven and a half years with Ajax, making 214 appearances in all competitions during his stint.

Inter Milan
On 1 July 2022, Inter Milan officially confirmed Onana's signing on a five-year contract.

International career
Onana is a former Cameroon youth international. He was named in Cameroon's squad for a friendly against France in May 2016.

Onana debuted for Cameroon in a 2–1 friendly win over Gabon in September 2016. He featured in the 2021 Africa Cup of Nations third-place game against Burkina Faso. On 9 November 2022, he was named in the final squad for the 2022 FIFA World Cup in Qatar. He played the first match against Switzerland, before being dropped in the second against Serbia, then he was eventually sent home from the tournament on 28 November by manager Rigobert Song due to a disciplinary issue related to arguments about the latter's coaching tactics. Onana announced his retirement from international football on 23 December 2022.

Personal life
His cousin, Fabrice Ondoa, also plays as a goalkeeper.

In May 2019, Onana spoke out about being a black goalkeeper, saying they had to work harder than their white counterparts due to misconceptions about them making "mistakes".

Career statistics

Club

International

Honours
Ajax
 Eredivisie: 2018–19, 2020–21, 2021–22
 KNVB Cup: 2018–19, 2020–21
 Johan Cruyff Shield: 2019
 UEFA Europa League runner-up: 2016–17
Inter Milan

 Supercoppa Italiana: 2022

Cameroon
 Africa Cup of Nations third place: 2021

Individual   
 Indomitable Lion of the Year (Cameroonian footballer of the year): 2018
 Best African Goalkeeper: 2018
 Eredivisie Team of the Year: 2018–19
 CAF Team of the Year: 2019
IFFHS CAF Men Team of The Year: 2020

References

External links
Profile at the Inter Milan website

1996 births
Living people
Cameroonian footballers
Association football goalkeepers
Cameroon international footballers
Cameroon youth international footballers
2017 FIFA Confederations Cup players
2019 Africa Cup of Nations players
2021 Africa Cup of Nations players
2022 FIFA World Cup players
FC Barcelona players
AFC Ajax players
Jong Ajax players
Inter Milan players
Eredivisie players
Eerste Divisie players
Cameroonian expatriate footballers
Cameroonian expatriate sportspeople in Spain
Expatriate footballers in Spain
Cameroonian expatriate sportspeople in the Netherlands
Expatriate footballers in the Netherlands
Cameroonian expatriate sportspeople in Italy
Expatriate footballers in Italy
Doping cases in association football
People from Centre Region (Cameroon)
Serie A players